The Stonewall Brigade Band is a community concert band based in Staunton, Virginia.  It is the United States's oldest continuous community band sponsored by local government and funded, in part, by tax monies. Originally a brass band, the  band was formed in 1855 as the Mountain Sax Horn Band. It was also called Turner's Silver Cornet Band by 1859, for its first director, A. J. Turner. At the onset of the American Civil War, the band was mustered into the 5th Virginia Infantry Regiment, part of the Stonewall Brigade under Stonewall Jackson.

Antebellum history

In Staunton, Virginia in 1855 one David W. Drake wished to found a band. He enlisted the help of his former music teacher in Newtown. Drake prevailed upon A. J. Turner to move to Staunton. These two and other white, male citizens of the city formed the Mountain Saxhorn Band. The band's first formal concert occurred on July 17, 1857 at Union Hall on Beverley Street in Staunton. 

During the 1850s, the band began a tradition of playing for civic occasions, including political rallies held for Presidents Millard Fillmore and Franklin Pierce and candidates Stephen A. Douglas and John C. Breckinridge.

On April 4, 1861, Turner's Silver Cornet Band, together with the Staunton Musical Association and the Glee Club, presented at Armory Hall the last concert that was to be given before the Civil War.

Civil War
The band earned the name Stonewall Brigade Band soon after First Manassas, and has been known as such ever since. In addition to their instruments, the band members also fought and acted as couriers and letter bearers or medical assistants. In addition to entertaining the troops in the field, they frequently appeared in concerts in Fredericksburg, Richmond, Staunton, and elsewhere to help recruiting rallies, clothing drives, and war relief fund raising.

On August 22, 1861, Stonewall Jackson wrote to his wife "I wish my darling could be with me now and 
enjoy the sweet music of the brass band of the Fifth Regiment. It is an excellent band." Jackson was fond of music, but had no talent for it, and confessed he could not recognize one song from another.

Post war reorganization
The band was reorganized in 1869 with A. J. serving as leader. His son T. M. Turner served as assistant leader. 

By 1875 the band was formally known as the Stonewall Brigade Band. The band's instruments from the time of the Civil War are still exhibited in their band room. They were apparently allowed to keep them as they were considered personal possessions, but several legends grew that Ulysses S. Grant allowed the band to keep their instruments through some special order. Perhaps due to the legend, the band grew a certain fondness for Grant, and on June 30, 1874, the band greeted Grant in Staunton with several songs. Upon being asked, Mayor Trout identified the band as the Stonewall Brigade Band. Grant responded with a murmur: "The Immortal Jackson". The Band also played at Grant's funeral in 1885.

On April Fools Day 1878, the band was sent a letter that the Governor had appointed them to play in Paris.

In 1885 the band presented the daughter of Stonewall Jackson a wedding gift of a souvenir band roster printed on white satin. The band and its war-time instruments were exhibited at the 1893 World's Fair in Chicago.

Gypsy Hill Park
The band has a bandstand in Gypsy Hill Park. The band performed in Gypsy Hill Park for Arbor Day, 1889.

Members

Original members
The earliest records list fourteen original members:

J. W. Alby
Samuel C. Baskins
Edwin M. Cushing
Alexander A. Grove
David E. Strasburg
James A. Armentrout
James Harvey Burdett
Augustus Dalias
John Blair Hoge
Augustus J. Turner
Joseph P. Ast
William A. Burnett
David W. Drake
Horace M. Stoddard

Original war-time members
These men made up the original, officially authorized Fifth Regiment Band:

James A. Armentrout
Hugh Barr
John M. Carroll
Horace M. Stoddard
T. Memory Turner
Joseph P. Ast
Samuel Baskins
Alexander Grove
David Strasburg
Charles E. Wood
Price T. Barnitz
James Harvey Burdett
Charles E. Haines
A. J. Turner

List of directors
Directors of the Stonewall Brigade Band include:
A. J. Turner (1855–1884)
F. R. Webb (1884–1892)
Francisco Touchon (1892–1892)
Thomas Prosho (1892–1893)
J. M. Brereton (1893–1904)
Thomas H. Beardsworth (1904–1922)
Martin G. Manch
Arthur Johnson (1922–1925)
Roy W. Wonson
William H. Ruebush 
Josef Studeny (1940–1948)
John P. Swiecki (1948–1958)
Paul B. Sanger (1958–1966)
Raymond Borrell (1966–1975)
Robert N. Moody (1975–2018)
Kevin Haynes (2018–)

References

External links
Band website

American brass bands
Stonewall Brigade
Musical groups established in 1855